John Guthrie Bulla (June 2, 1914 – December 7, 2003) was an American professional golfer.

Born in Newell, West Virginia, Bulla played on the PGA Tour, winning the 1941 Los Angeles Open, and finished runner-up three times in the majors, including twice to Sam Snead; at the British Open in 1946 and the Masters in 1949. Bulla's greatest moment might have been the British Open in 1939 at St Andrews. In miserable conditions, he drove flawlessly and never missed a fairway. The driver is on display in the Royal & Ancient Golf Club Museum, but his name is missing from the Claret Jug. Bulla finished early that day and was the leader in the clubhouse, which he held until Dick Burton, in the final group, caught him and won with a birdie on the last hole. Although Bulla never won a major, he finished in the top-10 12 times; twice each in the Masters and PGA Championship and four times each at the British Open and U.S. Open.

In January 2000, the Carolinas Golf Reporters Association inducted Bulla into the Carolinas Golf Hall of Fame. He co-founded Arizona Airways, which became Frontier Airlines in 1950.

Bulla was a private pilot and before World War II, he flew himself to various tournaments. He was later a commercial pilot with Eastern Airlines, and shortly after the war, Bulla and several other touring pros bought a C-47 cargo plane from the U.S. Army Air Forces to fly themselves and their wives to golf tournaments, with Bulla at the controls.

Bulla was the first to endorse merchandise sold outside the golf pro shop. He won the L.A. Open in 1941 with a discount golf ball, which sold for a quarter at Walgreens.

Professional wins (8)

PGA Tour wins (1)
1941 Los Angeles Open

Other wins (7)
1947 Arizona Open
1950 Arizona Open
1951 Pennsylvania Open Championship, Arizona Open
1958 Southern California PGA Championship, Arizona Open
1959 Arizona Open

Results in major championships

NT = no tournament
DQ = disqualified
CUT = missed the half-way cut (3rd round cut in 1959 PGA Championship)
R32, R16, QF, SF = round in which player lost in PGA Championship match play
"T" indicates a tie for a place

Summary

Most consecutive cuts made – 23 (1941 Masters – 1951 PGA)
Longest streak of top-10s – 4 (1948 U.S. Open – 1949 Masters)

References

External links
Carolinas Golf Hall of Fame profile
Arizona Gravestones – Johnny Bulla obituary

American male golfers
PGA Tour golfers
Golfers from West Virginia
Commercial aviators
People from Hancock County, West Virginia
1914 births
2003 deaths